Norway–Pakistan relations are foreign relations between Norway and Pakistan. Norway provides development assistance to Pakistan, particularly in the areas of governance and education. On a smaller scale, Norway has contributed toward documentation and preservation of Pakistan's cultural heritage.

Pakistanis form one of the largest immigrant community in Norway. Most Pakistanis in Norway come from the Punjab, Pakistan, and live in Oslo and Drammen.

Pakistan operates an Antarctic research station in the Norwegian-claimed Antarctic territory of Queen Maud Land.

Norway maintains an embassy in Islamabad and an honorary consulate in Lahore and Pakistan has an embassy in Oslo.

Transportation

Pakistan International Airlines operates two flights from Oslo Airport Gardermoen to Islamabad and Lahore.

See also
Pakistani Norwegians

References

Further reading
Norwegian Pakistanis: Criminals must not be allowed to fly off to Norway, says Ambassador Landsverk

 
Pakistan
Bilateral relations of Pakistan